My Strange Addiction is an American documentary television series that premiered on TLC on December 29, 2010. The pilot was broadcast on May 5, 2010. The series focuses on people with unusual compulsive behaviors. These range from eating specific non-food items to ritualistic daily activities to bizarre personal fixations or beliefs.

Premise
Despite the title of the show, few of the show's subjects have what would medically be classified as true addiction, neither conventional (substance-related) nor behavioral. Rather, the cause of their behavior varies and may include a variety of psychiatric diagnosis. Examples of disorders on the show are: obsessive-compulsive disorder, pica, paraphilia, schizophrenia, psychosis, Alzheimer's disease, exercise bulimia, trichotillomania, body dysmorphic disorder, dermatillomania, and object sexuality. Many of these "addictions" could be considered harmful.

Episodes

Season 1 (2010-11)

Season 2 (2011)

Season 3 (2012)

Season 4 (2013)

Season 5 (2014)

Season 6 (2015)

Reception
Daily News (New York) declared the show the "most disgusting reality show on television," while US Weekly gave the series a two star rating, stating "afflictions are fascinating, but too much time is spent gawking at their odd behavior as opposed to treating it. Only in the final moments do therapists pay a visit, and they oversimplify things by suggesting exercise and journaling!" TV Guide called the series "maybe the most entertaining freak show on television now, and definitely the most guilt-free one" noting that "the lack of hand-wringing feels deliciously subversive."

Authenticity
Specific cases on the show have raised concerns that at least some portrayals are fictional or falsified.  For example, the large number of Pica-like cases where subjects claim they consume materials that are known to be fatal when swallowed in the quantities shown.  These include gasoline, camphor (contained in VapoRub), broken glass, and other non-food objects.  In a recent Reddit post, Kesha who appeared in the 1st episode has revealed that producers had "encouraged situational storylines and fed lines to her friends." Producers were also heavily careless and wanted "ratings & crazy addictions", Kesha also revealed that the backstories were fake and that it had actually started from a "health blog."

References

External links
 

2010s American documentary television series
2010 American television series debuts
2015 American television series endings
English-language television shows
TLC (TV network) original programming
Works about addiction